The International Network of Engaged Buddhists (INEB) is an organization that connects engaged Buddhists from around the world with the aim of addressing with environmental concerns, human rights, and conflict resolution. It was established in February 1989 by Sulak Sivaraksa and has members in about 20 countries around the world, mostly in Asia, but also in the US, Australia and Europe. Its members include monks, nuns, activists, academics and social workers. While it is a Buddhist organization some of its members come from other spiritual traditions and interfaith activities are part of its program. INEB holds an international conference of its members once every two years.

Partners

East Asia

Japan
Japanese Network of Engaged Buddhists (JNEB)
JIPPO
International Buddhist Exchange Center

South Korea
Jungto Society
Buddhist Solidarity for Reform (BSR)

Taiwan
Fo Guang University working group
Buddhist Hong-Shi College working group

Southeast Asia

Cambodia
Buddhists and Khmer Society Network
Khmer Youth Association
Dhammayetra

Indonesia
Hikmahbudhi
Dhammajala

Laos
Lao Buddhism for Development
Participatory Development Training Center

Malaysia
Buddhist Missionary Society

Myanmar
Buddhist Youth Empowerment Program
Alternative Education for Social Engagement
Phaung Daw Oo Monastic School
Mon Women Organization
Sasana Moli

Singapore
(Individual activists)

Thailand
Sathirakoses-Nagapradipa Foundation
Spirit in Education Movement
Buddhika
Bhukkuni Thai Institute
International Women's Partnership for Peace and Justice
Wongsanit Ashram
Sekhiya Dhamma Group
Dhamma Park Foundation
Santi Pracha Dhamma Institute
Dhamma Drops Foundation
Mahachulalongkorn University working group
Garden of Fruition
School for Well-being

Vietnam
(Individual activists)

South Asia

Bangladesh
Parbatya Bouddha Mission
Atish Dipankar Society

Bhutan
Bhutan Nuns Association
Samdrup Jongkhar Initiative

India
Jambudvipa Trust
Deer Park Institute
Young Buddhist Society of India (YBS)
Ladakh Nuns Association
Adecom Network

Nepal
Bikalpa Gyan Kendra
(Individual activists)

Sri Lanka
INEB Sri Lanka
Sewalanka Foundation
Dharmavedi Institute

Oceania

Australia
Buddhist Peace Fellowship Australia

Europe

Belgium
European Buddhist Union

Netherlands
European Buddhist Union

North America

United States
Buddhist Peace Fellowship
Clear View Project
Nekorpa and RIGPA Fellowship

South America

Brazil
Instituto Visao Futuro
Organização Religiosa Tendai Hokke Ichijo Ryu do Brasil

Costa Rica
University for Peace

Africa

South Africa
Hout Bay Theravada Sangha

References

External links
 International Network of Engaged Buddhists

International Buddhist organizations
Engaged Buddhism
Religious organizations established in 1989